China United Network Communications Group Co., Ltd. or China Unicom (CUniq in short) is a Chinese state-owned telecommunications operator. Started as a wireless paging and GSM mobile operator, it currently provides a range of services including mobile network, long-distance, local calling, data communication, Internet services, and IP telephony.

History 
China Unicom (known as  Pinyin: Zhōngguó liánhé tōngxìn yǒuxiàn gōngsī at that time) was founded as a state-owned enterprise on 18 June 1994 by the Ministry of Railways, the Ministry of Electronics  and the Ministry of Electric Power Industry ; the establishment was approved by the State Council in December 1993.

China Unicom has operated a CDMA network in Macau since October18, 2006 and internet services in North Korea since 2010. , the company had 125 million GSM subscribers and 43 million CDMA subscribers. As of November 2008 the CDMA operations have been moved to China Telecommunications Corporation (China Telecom Group). On 7 January 2009, China Unicom was awarded WCDMA license to expand its business to 3G telecommunication. UMTS (Universal Mobile Telecommunications System) was launched in major cities across China on May 17, 2009.

On July 11, 2020, China Unicom joined hands with LuHan to launch the "FuLu Companion Card", which sounded the forward number for the further development of 5G.  LuHan also officially unlocked his new identity and became a "China Unicom Innovation Partner", with the "FuLu companion card" to bring exclusive benefits and surprises to the majority of Unicom users.

IPOs
In February 2000 a subsidiary "China Unicom Hong Kong" was incorporated in Hong Kong and was listed on the Hong Kong Stock Exchange on June 22, 2000.

The intermediate parent company "China Unicom (Hong Kong) Limited" was "China Unicom (BVI) Limited", the BVI company owned 77.47% shares of China Unicom (H.K.). In turn, China Unicom (H.K.) owned the operating subsidiaries of the group. In 2002, another intermediate parent company "China United Network Communications Limited" was established in Shanghai (headquartered in Beijing), to own 51% stake of "China Unicom (BVI) Limited" as well as listing the shares in the Shanghai Stock Exchange. , state-owned China Unicom Group owned 74.6% shares of the A share company, in turn the A share company owned 73.84% of the BVI company. The BVI company owned 77.47% shares of the red chip company. To sum up, the Chinese Government via A share company, owned 42.67% stake of the operating subsidiaries, as well as additional 20.27% stake by the minority stake in the BVI company.

Merger with China Netcom
On June 2, 2008, China Unicom announced its intention to sell its CDMA business and assets to China Telecommunications Corporation (China Telecom Group) for a combined total of 110 billion RMB and to merge the remainder of the company, in a share swap valued at US$56.3 billion (based on Unicom's stock last traded price) on June 2, 2008, with China Netcom. The CDMA business was officially moved to China Telecom in early November.

In July 2009, China Unicom signed a $700 million deal with infrastructure vendor Ericsson to upgrade the company's GSM network.

China Unicom has operated an internet service in the North Korea since 2010.

In April 2012, China Unicom was a founding member in the formation of Cloud Computing Industry Alliance in Beijing. Other members of the alliance include Baidu, Tencent, and Alibaba.

Partnership with Telefonica 
In 2009, China Unicom (Hong Kong) agreed to a US$1 billion cross-holding with Spain's Telefónica. In January 2011, the two partners agreed a further US$500 million tie-up in each other, which following completion in late 2011, Telefónica will hold a 9.7% shares in China Unicom (H.K.), while the red chip company will own 1.4% shares of the Spanish firm. The companies also agreed to deepen their cooperation in areas such as procurement, mobile service platforms, service to MNC's wholesale carriers, roaming, technology, among others, where both companies have been cooperating since the signature of their strategic alliance agreement.

In June 2012, China United Network Communications Group (China Unicom Group), the ultimate parent company of Hong Kong listed company "China Unicom (Hong Kong)", had agreed to buy back about 1.1 billion shares (approx. 4.6% of the share capital) of the red chip company from Telefónica for an approx. HK$11 billion. (HK$10.21 per share; by narrow band floating exchange rate approx. US$1.4 billion), via an unlisted subsidiary "China Unicom Group Corporation (BVI) Limited". Immediate after the deal, Telefónica still owned 5% of China Unicom (H.K.). In 2014 Telefónica sold a further 2.5% shares of "China Unicom (H.K.)" for HK$6.66 billion (HK$11.14 per share)

During year 2016, Telefónica sold a further 1.51% shares of "China Unicom (H.K.)" for HK$2.822 billion (HK$7.8 per share),  Telefónica owned 1% shares of the red chip company (decreased from 2.51% year-to-yearly), as well as Telefónica's director César Alierta, still served as a director of "China Unicom (H.K.)".

Mixed-ownership reform of state-owned enterprise
In 2017 China Unicom became one of the pilot projects of the mixed-ownership reform of the Chinese state-owned enterprise, which saw a decrease in the Government's ownership.

In 2017 the Class A listed company of the group introduced ten strategic investors: state-controlled , state-controlled listed company China Life Insurance, a private equity fund that was owned by China Cinda Asset Management and a company related to Tencent, a private equity fund partially owned by Baidu and Industrial Bank, a private equity fund that related to JD.com, a public company Ali Venture Capital, a public company Suning Commerce Group and three minor private equity funds that was subscribed by companies such as Kuang-Chi and CRRC Group.

In the same year, the fund raised by the A share company was injected to the Hong Kong incorporated red chip company, via "China Unicom (BVI) Limited", for HK$13.24 per share (for a maximum of 6.64 billion share / HK$88 billion).

Establishment of China Unicom Global Limited 

On 2 December 2016, China Unicom Global Limited launched the “CUniq” overseas mobile virtual network operator (“MVNO”) service in London, UK and unveiled the one-card-multiple-number service.

U.S. sanctions 

In October 2019, a group of U.S. senators urged the Federal Retirement Thrift Investment Board to divest U.S. pension money from any investment in China Unicom for providing telecommunications services to disputed artificial islands in the South China Sea. In August 2020, the United States Department of Defense published a list of companies operating directly or indirectly in the United States with ties to the People's Liberation Army. China Unicom was included on the list.

In October 2020, the Federal Communications Commission (FCC) requested the United States Department of Justice report whether China Unicom poses a "national security risk".

In November 2020, the U.S. President issued an executive order prohibiting U.S. companies and individuals owning stocks that the United States Department of Defense deemed to have links to the People's Liberation Army - which included China Unicom. In consequence of the order, the New York Stock Exchange delisted China Unicom in January 2021.

In March 2021, the FCC initiated proceedings to revoke China Unicom's authorization to operate in the U.S. due to "national security" concerns. In January, 2022, the FCC revoked China Unicom's authorization to operate in the United States, giving it 60 days to cease providing telecommunications services. In September 2022, the FCC added China Unicom to a list of companies considered "national security threats".

Equity investments

 PCCW (18.46%, held by unlisted portion of China Unicom Group)
 Telefónica (1.27%, held by Hong Kong listed subsidiary "China Unicom (H.K.)")

Reaction

Surveillance allegations 
In December 2020, The Guardian reported that a security researcher identified evidence of surveillance campaign against Americans by China Unicom via Caribbean mobile networks. China Unicom strongly denied the allegations.

See also 
 Communications in China
 Telecommunications industry in China
 List of telephone operating companies

Footnotes

References

External links 

 

 
1994 establishments in China
Alibaba Group
Baidu
Chinese brands
Chinese companies established in 1994
Companies based in Beijing
Companies formerly listed on the New York Stock Exchange
Companies in the CSI 100 Index
Companies in the Hang Seng Index
Companies listed on the Hong Kong Stock Exchange
Companies listed on the Shanghai Stock Exchange
Internet in North Korea
Mobile phone companies of China
Privatization in China
Telecommunications companies established in 1994
Telecommunications companies of China
Telefónica
Tencent
Government-owned telecommunications companies
Government-owned companies of China